Beachlands is an outer suburb of Auckland, New Zealand, established in the 1920s, where development increased in the 1950s due to its popularity as a beach holiday destination. It is located on the "Pohutukawa Coast" and in close proximity to Maraetai.

While connected to Auckland's waste water reticulation, all the properties collect their own rain water. Some properties have tapped into the underlying aquifers fed from the adjacent Maraetai-Brookby range of hills. No potable rivers are utilised for potable water locally.

Many English migrants and increasing numbers of South Africans have moved into the area in recent years. Houses in old Beachlands often come with a quarter of an acre of land. The housing ranges from cliff top mansions to rambling and somewhat run down baches. The newer areas of Pine Harbour, Spinnaker Bay and Pony Park contain modern houses, generally with smaller gardens than in old Beachlands. District plan minimum size is 700 square metres for a section (piece of land), although some subdivisions were approved during a brief period which saw some in-fill housing (more sections in a given area).

The fully serviced marina at Pine Harbour includes a ferry service to central Auckland with 20 departures per day in each direction on Mondays to Fridays. In 2015, the 570-berth Pine Harbour Marina and some 9 hectares of associated land were sold for $22 million.

Natural attractions in the immediate area include Sunkist Bay Beach, Shelly Beach and Snapper Rock. The Domain is the small park in the centre of Beachlands on the corner of Beachlands Road, Sunkist Bay Road and Karaka Road. Offshore, Motukaraka Island (also known as Flat Top Island or Flat Island) is located near the entrance to Pine Harbour Marina and is accessible at low tide. It is a short walk from the shore.

Te Puru Sports Centre, located in Te Puru Park between Beachlands and Maraetai, is the base for the Te Puru Keas (junior cubs), Cubs, Scouts and Venturers. A gym, tennis, sports fields and a large indoor arena provide a cultural centre that unites Beachlands and neighbouring Maraetai into 'the Pohutukawa Coast' community. The Te Puru Centre was initiated by local effort and fundraising and completed with a 50% grant from former Manukau City Mayor Sir Barry Curtis.

A walkway/cycle-way runs between Maraetai and Beachlands following the coast through Omana and Te Puru.

Demographics
Beachlands is described by Statistics New Zealand as a small urban area, which it calls Beachlands-Pine Harbour.

Beachlands had a population of 6,261 at the 2018 New Zealand census, an increase of 1,695 people (37.1%) since the 2013 census, and an increase of 2,844 people (83.2%) since the 2006 census. There were 2,046 households, comprising 3,144 males and 3,114 females, giving a sex ratio of 1.01 males per female, with 1,539 people (24.6%) aged under 15 years, 927 (14.8%) aged 15 to 29, 3,096 (49.4%) aged 30 to 64, and 699 (11.2%) aged 65 or older.

Ethnicities were 91.7% European/Pākehā, 8.6% Māori, 2.6% Pacific peoples, 5.3% Asian, and 2.3% other ethnicities. People may identify with more than one ethnicity.

The percentage of people born overseas was 27.2, compared with 27.1% nationally.

Although some people chose not to answer the census's question about religious affiliation, 55.4% had no religion, 34.7% were Christian, 0.3% had Māori religious beliefs, 0.6% were Hindu, 0.4% were Muslim, 0.3% were Buddhist and 1.8% had other religions.

Of those at least 15 years old, 1,224 (25.9%) people had a bachelor's or higher degree, and 540 (11.4%) people had no formal qualifications. 1,638 people (34.7%) earned over $70,000 compared to 17.2% nationally. The employment status of those at least 15 was that 2,772 (58.7%) people were employed full-time, 741 (15.7%) were part-time, and 120 (2.5%) were unemployed.

Education

There are no colleges for students aged 13–18 in the area but there are free buses providing access to schools such as Howick College and Botany Downs Secondary College as well as special character schools such as Elim Christian College, Sancta Maria College, Saint Kentigern College and Star of the Sea primary school.

References

Beachlands
Geography of Auckland
Beaches of the Auckland Region
Populated places around the Hauraki Gulf / Tīkapa Moana